is a passenger railway station located in the town of in Miki, Kagawa, Japan.  It is operated by the private transportation company Takamatsu-Kotohira Electric Railroad (Kotoden) and is designated station "N12".

Lines

Layout
The station consists of two opposed side platforms connected by a level crossing. The station is unattended.

Adjacent stations

History
Hiragi Station opened on April 30, 1912 as a station of the Kotohira Electric Railway. On November 1, 1943 it became  a station on the Takamatsu Kotohira Electric Railway Kotohira Line due to a company merger. The station building was reconstructed in 1978.

Surrounding area
 Miki Municipal Miki Junior High School

Ridership

See also
 List of railway stations in Japan

References

External links

  

Railway stations in Japan opened in 1912
Railway stations in Kagawa Prefecture
Miki, Kagawa